Kim Jung-mi (born 28 September 1975) is a South Korean sport shooter who competed in the 1996 Summer Olympics and in the 2004 Summer Olympics.

References

1975 births
Living people
South Korean female sport shooters
ISSF rifle shooters
Olympic shooters of South Korea
Shooters at the 1996 Summer Olympics
Shooters at the 2004 Summer Olympics
Shooters at the 1998 Asian Games
Shooters at the 2002 Asian Games
Shooters at the 2010 Asian Games
Asian Games medalists in shooting
Asian Games gold medalists for South Korea
Asian Games silver medalists for South Korea
Medalists at the 1998 Asian Games
Medalists at the 2002 Asian Games
Medalists at the 2010 Asian Games
20th-century South Korean women
21st-century South Korean women